Erica Sullivan may refer to:
Erica James, née Sullivan, British romance novelist
Erica Sullivan (swimmer), American swimmer